Geeta Chandran is an Indian Bharatanatyam dancer and vocalist. Trained in Carnatic music, she is a visionary and celebrated artist in Indian classical Bharatanatyam, recognized for her work in theatre, dance, education, videos and films.

Career 
In order to expand her frontiers in the classical arts, Geeta Chandran has collaborated with  dancers, musicians, authors, writers, poets, painters, theatre-personalities, academicians, philosophers, linguists and costume & fashion designers.

Education and early career 
Her specialization in Bharatanatyam Abhinaya began at the feet of her first Guru, Abhinaya Saraswathy, followed by Gurus Jamuna Krishnan and Smt. Kalanidhi Narayanan, who helped hone her skills. Geeta’s Junior Fellowship from the Ministry of Culture was for a project on Vachika Abhinaya, which linked her dance to her training as a Carnatic vocalist.

After doing her Master's degree from IIMC in 1984, she used to work as a Course Coordinator at IIMC for one year before attending NAMEDIA Foundation, where she worked alongside renowned media luminaries Nikhil Chakravorty and N.L. Chawla, former IIMC Director. On receiving the Padma Shri, she said "What I learned at IIMC laid the groundwork for my pedagogy of social communication through dance. All of my work in environmental, gender and peace performances can be traced back to IIMC. That is something I will be eternally grateful for." Later, She worked in NTPC's public relations department before committing full-time to Bharatanatyam, her passion since the age of five.

Leadership roles 
As founder and President of the Dance Company Natya Vriksha, her areas of engagement have ranged from pure classical work and research, to intense preparation of classical soloists, creating group choreographies and also engaging with cross-over work. She is also the Professor Adjunct at Birla Institute of Technology, Pilani, driven by the strong belief that dance should make a difference to life and living.

She is nominee to the executive Board of the Central Sangeet Natak Acacdemy and she is a Member of the General Council of the SNA. She is also a Member of the General Council of the Indian Council for Cultural Relations and is a Member on ICCR's Empanelment Committee.

Contributions 
Her commitment to Arts Education has led her to advocating incremental arts education supporting both government and private initiatives to achieve a higher level of arts learning as part of formal education. She has guided reputed national cultural institutions like SPIC MACAY and prestigious universities as their Board member. She has also served on the Advisory Boards of several reputed schools and colleges, engaging with various dance-related activities such as performing, teaching, conducting, singing, collaborating, organizing, writing and speaking to new youth audiences.

In the summer of 2013, she travelled through Poland popularizing Bharatanatyam and Indian values.

She is also associated with several NGOs and is well-known for her philanthropic work, especially regarding issues of gender and poverty.

Publications 
She has narrated an intensely personal collection about her engagement with Bharatanatyam in her autobiography 'So Many Journeys'. She has also written articles for dance columns in The New Indian Express.

Recognition 
She received the Dandayudhapani Pillai Award for Bharatanatyam in 2001 and the Millennium Award. The Government of India awarded Chandran the Padma Shri, the fourth highest civilian honor, in 2007, for her contributions to the field of art.

In 2007, she was invited to perform at the World Hindi Conference in New York, and then again to represent India at the India-60 celebrations at the Lincoln Centre in New York. She was invited to travel all over the UK as part of the celebrations of 60 year of the Indian Republic. 

In April 2009, in her book  author Canadian Anne Dublin's book entitled Dynamic Women Dancers (Women's Hall of Fame series) listed Geeta Chandran as one of ten global all time great dancers.

Geeta Chandran has been conferred the Sangeet Natak Akademi Puruskar for Bharatanatyam for the year 2016.  

She has received several other notable awards, including the Lady Shri Ram College Illustrious Alumna Award, the Bharat Nirman Award, the Natya Ilavarasi, the Indira Priyadarshini Award, the Media India Award, the National Critics Award, the Sringar Mani and the Natya Ratna.

The Alumni Association of the Indian Institute of Mass Communications also awarded her with its first Lifetime Achievement Award during the 10th annual meet Connections on 27th February, 2022.

References 

Year of birth missing (living people)
Living people
Recipients of the Padma Shri in arts
Indian female classical dancers
Performers of Indian classical dance
Bharatanatyam exponents
Dancers from Delhi
20th-century Indian dancers
20th-century Indian women artists
Women artists from Delhi
Recipients of the Sangeet Natak Akademi Award